Furan (also Romanized as Fūrān and Fooran) is a village in Deh Chal Rural District, in the Central District of Khondab County, Markazi Province, Iran. At the 2006 census, its population was 1,573, in 356 families.

References 

Populated places in Khondab County